Summit High School is a public charter high school in Phoenix, Arizona. It is operated by The Leona Group.

Public high schools in Arizona
The Leona Group
High schools in Phoenix, Arizona
Charter schools in Arizona